The 2020 Barangay Ginebra San Miguel season was the 41st season of the franchise in the Philippine Basketball Association (PBA).

Key dates
December 8: The 2019 PBA draft took place in Midtown Atrium, Robinson Place Manila.
March 11: The PBA postponed the season due to the threat of the coronavirus.

Draft picks

Roster

  Also serves as Barangay Ginebra's board governor.

Philippine Cup

Eliminations

Standings

Game log

|-bgcolor=ccffcc
| 1
| October 11
| NLEX
| W 102–92
| Aljon Mariano (20)
| Scottie Thompson (11)
| Pringle, Thompson (5)
| AUF Sports Arena & Cultural Center
| 1–0
|-bgcolor=ccffcc
| 2
| October 15
| Blackwater
| W 103–99
| Prince Caperal (24)
| Aljon Mariano (11)
| Scottie Thompson (7)
| AUF Sports Arena & Cultural Center
| 2–0
|-bgcolor=ccffcc
| 3
| October 18
| Meralco
| W 105–91
| Japeth Aguilar (20)
| Stanley Pringle (7)
| Dillinger, Thompson (5)
| AUF Sports Arena & Cultural Center
| 3–0
|-bgcolor=ccffcc
| 4
| October 21
| Phoenix
| W 86–71
| Stanley Pringle (20)
| Prince Caperal (10)
| Scottie Thompson (7)
| AUF Sports Arena & Cultural Center
| 4–0
|-bgcolor=ffcccc
| 5
| October 25
| Magnolia
| L 92–102
| Stanley Pringle (24)
| Scottie Thompson (14)
| Scottie Thompson (7)
| AUF Sports Arena & Cultural Center
| 4–1
|-bgcolor=ffcccc
| 6
| October 27
| Rain or Shine
| L 82–85 (OT)
| Scottie Thompson (21)
| Japeth Aguilar (12)
| Stanley Pringle (6)
| AUF Sports Arena & Cultural Center
| 4–2

|-bgcolor=ccffcc
| 7
| November 3
| Alaska
| W 87–81
| Stanley Pringle (31)
| Scottie Thompson (10)
| Tenorio, Thompson (6)
| AUF Sports Arena & Cultural Center
| 5–2
|-bgcolor=ccffcc
| 8
| November 4
| NorthPort
| W 112–100
| Stanley Pringle (17)
| Aguilar, Pringle (8)
| Scottie Thompson (8)
| AUF Sports Arena & Cultural Center
| 6–2
|-bgcolor=ccffcc
| 9
| November 6
| TNT
| W 85–79
| Stanley Pringle (28)
| Stanley Pringle (12)
| LA Tenorio (9)
| AUF Sports Arena & Cultural Center
| 7–2
|-bgcolor=ffcccc
| 10
| November 8
| San Miguel
| L 66–81
| Japeth Aguilar (13)
| Aljon Mariano (12)
| Scottie Thompson (10)
| AUF Sports Arena & Cultural Center
| 7–3
|-bgcolor=ccffcc
| 11
| November 9
| Terrafirma
| W 102–80
| Japeth Aguilar (21)
| Mariano, Thompson (11)
| Scottie Thompson (9)
| AUF Sports Arena & Cultural Center
| 8–3

Playoffs

Bracket

Game log

|-bgcolor=ccffcc
| 1
| November 13
| Rain or Shine
| W 81–73
| Japeth Aguilar (23)
| Japeth Aguilar (11)
| LA Tenorio (8)
| AUF Sports Arena & Cultural Center
| 1–0

|-bgcolor=ccffcc
| 1
| November 18
| Meralco
| W 96–79
| Stanley Pringle (19)
| Scottie Thompson (9)
| Scottie Thompson (8)
| AUF Sports Arena & Cultural Center
| 1–0
|-bgcolor=ffcccc
| 2
| November 20
| Meralco
| L 77–95
| Japeth Aguilar (17)
| Scottie Thompson (9)
| Scottie Thompson (5)
| AUF Sports Arena & Cultural Center
| 1–1
|-bgcolor=ccffcc
| 3
| November 22
| Meralco
| W 91–84
| Stanley Pringle (24)
| Japeth Aguilar (13)
| Stanley Pringle (6)
| AUF Sports Arena & Cultural Center
| 2–1
|-bgcolor=ffcccc
| 4
| November 25
| Meralco
| L 80–83
| Stanley Pringle (18)
| Japeth Aguilar (12)
| Stanley Pringle (6)
| AUF Sports Arena & Cultural Center
| 2–2
|-bgcolor=ccffcc
| 5
| November 27
| Meralco
| W 83–80
| Stanley Pringle (22)
| Scottie Thompson (12)
| Scottie Thompson (7)
| AUF Sports Arena & Cultural Center
| 3–2

|-bgcolor=ccffcc
| 1
| November 29
| TNT
| W 100–94 (OT)
| Japeth Aguilar (25)
| Japeth Aguilar (16)
| LA Tenorio (10)
| AUF Sports Arena & Cultural Center
| 1–0
|-bgcolor=ccffcc
| 2
| December 2
| TNT
| W 92–90
| Stanley Pringle (34)
| Mariano, Thompson (9)
| Stanley Pringle (8)
| AUF Sports Arena & Cultural Center
| 2–0
|-bgcolor=ffcccc
| 3
| December 4
| TNT
| L 67–88
| LA Tenorio (19)
| Japeth Aguilar (9)
| LA Tenorio (6)
| AUF Sports Arena & Cultural Center
| 2–1
|-bgcolor=ccffcc
| 4
| December 6
| TNT
| W 98–88
| Aguilar, Tenorio (22)
| Prince Caperal (12)
| Scottie Thompson (9)
| AUF Sports Arena & Cultural Center
| 3–1
|-bgcolor=ccffcc
| 5
| December 9
| TNT
| W 82–78
| Japeth Aguilar (32)
| Japeth Aguilar (9)
| Pringle, Tenorio (6)
| AUF Sports Arena & Cultural Center
| 4–1

Transactions

Free agents

Rookie signings

Awards

References

Barangay Ginebra San Miguel seasons
Barangay Ginebra San Miguel